Galatasaray SK Wheelchair Basketball 2006–2007 season is the 2006–2007 basketball season for Turkish professional basketball club Galatasaray SK.

The club competes in:
 André Vergauwen Cup
 Turkish Wheelchair Basketball Super League

2006-07 roster

Squad changes for the 2006–2007 season 

In:

Out:

Results, schedules and standings

Turkish Wheelchair Basketball Super League 2006–07

Regular season 
First Half

Second Half

Play-offs 

FINAL

André Vergauwen Cup

Qualification Tour

FINALS

Semi-final

3rd-4th-place match

Friendly Games

Chieti Cup 
 Galatasaray won the cup

FINAL

References 

Galatasaray S.K. (wheelchair basketball) seasons
2006–07 in Turkish basketball by club
2007 in wheelchair basketball
2006 in wheelchair basketball
Galatasaray Sports Club 2006–07 season